Abaratha is a genus of spread-winged skippers in the family Hesperiidae. It is found in the Indomalayan realm

Species
Abaratha abbreviata (de Jong, 2006) 
Abaratha agama (Moore, 1857) 
Abaratha alida (de Nicéville, 1891)  
Abaratha angulata (Felder, 1862) 
Abaratha corria (de Jong, 2006) 
Abaratha helias (Felder & Felder, [1867])  
Abaratha pygela (Hewitson, 1868) Sumatra, Malaya, Burma, Thailand, Borneo, Java, Banka, Nias
Abaratha leptogramma (Hewitson, 1868) Philippines.
Abaratha ransonnetii (Felder, 1868)

References

Natural History Museum Lepidoptera genus database

Tagiadini
Hesperiidae genera